The East Tennessee State Buccaneers football program is the intercollegiate American football team for East Tennessee State University (ETSU) located in Johnson City, Tennessee. The team was dormant from the end of the 2003 season until being reinstated for the 2015 season. They played all of their 2015 home games and all but one of their 2016 home games at Kermit Tipton Stadium before the opening of the new William B. Greene Jr. Stadium for the 2017 season. The remaining 2016 home game, against Western Carolina on September 17, was played at nearby Bristol Motor Speedway, which was already set up for football due to a game the prior week between the University of Tennessee and Virginia Tech . Before ETSU dropped football, it competed in NCAA Division I as a Southern Conference (SoCon) football program.  The revived program played as an independent in 2015 before returning to the SoCon in 2016.

History
East Tennessee State Normal School fielded its first football team in 1920. Navy blue and old gold, chosen in 1911, were the school colors. The team only played five games that year including two against local high school teams. W.R. Windes was the head coach for the first two seasons. In 1925, the school's name was changed to East Tennessee State Teachers College. The athletic teams were named "The Teachers". John Robinson was the head coach for the next 5 years.

In 1930, the school's name changed again to State Teachers College, Johnson City. In 1932, Gene McMurray was named the head coach. He coached for 10 straight seasons until the school stopped playing due to World War II. He came back to coach the team in 1946. His winning percentage during his 11 seasons was the highest in the history of Buc football. During his tenure, the team won the Smoky Mountain Conference championship in 1938 and the team's name changed to the "Buccaneers" (1935).

In 1943, the school's name changed to East Tennessee State College. In 1952, Star Wood became head coach. He led the team for 13 seasons; 1952 to 1953 and then 1955 to 1965. Coach Wood tops the list of total wins with 64. From 1952 to 1956, the team made five consecutive appearances in the Burley Bowl, compiling a 3–2 record. East Tennessee State College joined the Ohio Valley Conference in 1957.

In 1963, the college gained university status to become East Tennessee State University. Coach John Robert Bell led the team to a 10–0–1 record in 1969. They won the Ohio Valley Conference Championship and defeated Louisiana Tech, led by quarterback Terry Bradshaw, in the Grantland Rice Bowl. The Memorial Center opened in 1977 and was nicknamed the "Mini-Dome". The football team played their homes games indoors until the program was discontinued. In 1978, ETSU joined the Southern Conference.

The 1996 ETSU football team led by Coach Mike Cavan had a record of 10–3 and participated for the first time in the NCAA Division I-AA playoffs, defeating Villanova in a first-round game.

In 2003, ETSU decided to discontinue the football team due to financial reasons. The last game was played at home on Nov. 22, 2003 against The Citadel. ETSU won the game 16–13 with a last second field goal.  The school further left the Southern Conference.

On January 29, 2013, the Student Government Association voted 22–5 to a $125 per semester fee increase that would fund the re-instatement of the football program.  University President Dr. Brian Noland, who was in attendance for the vote, said that fee would be sufficient to support football and Title IX requirements that support additional women's athletics. Noland crafted a football proposal to submit to the Tennessee Board of Regents (TBR). The Regents passed it in March 2013.

On March 29, 2013, the TBR approved a $125 fee increase to reinstate football at ETSU. It had also become widely known across the campus that the Mini-Dome would not host home games.  ETSU is building a brand new football stadium to play host to all of its home games. On May 30, 2013, ETSU accepted an invitation to rejoin the Southern Conference in 2014 and reinstated football, with operations beginning shortly thereafter and the first class signed in 2014 in preparation for the first game in the 2015 season.

The Carl Torbush era
Veteran coach Carl Torbush was chosen to helm the rebuilding of the program, and signed the first class in 2014 in preparation for the 2015 season debut. For the first two years, they played home games at Kermit Tipton Stadium/Steve Spurrier Field located on the campus of Science Hill High School in Johnson City. It was announced on February 6, 2015 that ETSU would play Tennessee at Neyland Stadium on September 8, 2018, the first meeting between the two schools. ETSU will receive a $500,000 payment for the game. The Carl Torbush era began on September 3, 2015 as the Bucs took on the Kennesaw State Owls. On July 15, 2015, it was announced that the first game against Kennesaw State and the homecoming game against Emory & Henry had sold out, and that standing-only tickets were then available. Torbush and the fledgling Bucs finished the 2015 season with a 2–9 record, with the wins over Warner and Kentucky Wesleyan. Torbush then lead a much improved Bucs team to a 5–6 (2–6 SoCon) in 2016 including a revenge win against Kennesaw State, a win over Western Carolina at Bristol Motor Speedway (the most attended game in the program's history), and an upset against then 18th-ranked Samford. In 2017, the Bucs returned on campus to William B. Greene Jr. Stadium, where they were mostly successful. However, the Bucs finished with a disappointing 4–7 record. After the season, Torbush decided to retire on December 8, 2017, citing his age as key factor in not signing a contract  In three years as the Buccaneers head coach,  Torbush finished with an 11–22 (4–12 SoCon) record.

The Randy Sanders era
On December 17, 2017, following the retirement of Carl Torbush earlier in the month, the East Tennessee State Buccaneers named, former Florida State Seminoles football offensive coordinator, Randy Sanders as their eighteenth head coach. On September 1, 2018, Sanders won his first game as a head coach defeating Mars Hill 28–7. On September 4, 2021, Sanders led the Buccaneers to their first FBS win since 1987, defeating Vanderbilt 23–3.

Conference history

Classifications
 1952–1956: NAIA
 1957–1972: NCAA College Division
 1973–1977: NCAA Division II
 1978–2003: NCAA Division I–AA (now FCS)
 2004–2014: No team
 2015–present: NCAA Division I FCS

Conference memberships
 1920–1929, 1946–1948: Independent
 1930–1941, 1949–1951: Smoky Mountain Conference
 1949–1957: Volunteer State Athletic Conference
 1957–1978: Ohio Valley Conference
 1979–2003: Southern Conference
 2004–2014: No team
 2015: FCS independent
 2016–present: Southern Conference

Note: ETSU was a full member of the Southern Conference in the 2015–16 school year, but played the 2015 football season as an FCS independent.

Conference championships
The Buccaneers have won five conference championships, with one coming in the Smoky Mountain Conference, two in the Ohio Valley Conference and two in the Southern Conference.

† Co-champions

Division I-AA/FCS Playoffs results
The Buccaneers have appeared in the I-AA/FCS playoffs three times with an overall record of 2–3.

Notable former players

Notable alumni include:
 Donnie Abraham
 Chris Beatty
 Jorge Cimadevilla
 Jamey Chadwell
 Mack Cummings
 Dave Ewart
 Earl Ferrell
 Thane Gash
 Austin Herink
 Steven Jackson
 Maurice Kelly
 Jerry Kirk
 George Litton
 Jerry Mynatt
 Steve Parker
 Nasir Player
 Dalton Ponchillia
 Marcus Satterfield
 Gerald Sensabaugh
 Dainon Sidney
 Sam Streiter
 Mike Smith
 Tony Tiller 
 Jack Vest
 Van Williams

Yearly results

Future non-conference opponents 
Future non-conference opponents announced as of January 16, 2023.

References

External links
 

 
American football teams established in 1920
1920 establishments in Tennessee